Vancouver River is located in the Sunshine Coast region of the South Coast of British Columbia, Canada, emptying into Prince of Wales Reach of lower Jervis Inlet at the former cannery town of Vancouver Bay and the bay of the same name. The river is approximately 21 km in length.

See also 
List of rivers of British Columbia
List of rivers of the Pacific Ranges

References

External links

Rivers of the Pacific Ranges
Sunshine Coast (British Columbia)
New Westminster Land District